The Kinabalu horned frog or Balu spadefoot toad (Pelobatrachus baluensis) is a species of amphibian in the family Megophryidae. It is endemic to northeastern Borneo in Sabah, Malaysia. Its natural habitats are subtropical or tropical moist montane forests and rivers.

Formerly placed in the genus Megophrys, it was reclassified into the genus Pelobatrachus in 2021.

References

Pelobatrachus
Amphibians of Malaysia
Endemic fauna of Borneo
Endemic fauna of Malaysia
Taxonomy articles created by Polbot
Amphibians described in 1899
Amphibians of Borneo
Fauna of the Borneo montane rain forests